Remain may refer to:

Remain (José González EP)
Remain (KNK EP)
Remain, poetry book by Jennifer Murphy, 2005
Remain, album by Tyrone Wells, 2009
Remain, album by Great Divide, 2002
Remain, album by Them Are Us Too, 2015
"Remain", song by Kubb, 2005
"Remain", song by Upside Down
"Remain", song by Robert Forster from Inferno
 "Remain" (a member of the European Union), one of the two options available to voters in the 2016 United Kingdom European Union membership referendum
 Remainer, a person holding that opinion